The Atari Falcon030 (usually shortened to Atari Falcon), released in 1992, was the final personal computer from Atari Corporation. A high-end model of the Atari ST line, the machine is based on a Motorola 68030 CPU and a Motorola 56001 digital signal processor, which distinguishes it from most other microcomputers of the era. It includes a new VIDEL programmable graphics system which greatly improves graphics capabilities.

Shortly after release, Atari bundled the MultiTOS operating system in addition to TOS. TOS remained in ROM, and MultiTOS was supplied on floppy disk and could be installed to boot from hard disk.

The Falcon was discontinued in late 1993–a year after its introduction–as Atari restructured itself to focus completely on the release and support of the Jaguar video game console. The Falcon sold in relatively small numbers, mainly to hobbyists.

Hardware

The heart of the system is the 32-bit Motorola 68030 clocked at 16 MHz.  It runs at about 5.76 MIPS while displaying video modes with the fewest colors. Despite its 32-bit CPU, the Falcon does not have 32-bit architecture throughout its design, as it has a 16-bit data bus and a 24-bit address bus. This reduces the 68030's performance when not operating inside its tiny cache and limits the maximum system memory to ≈14 MB.

The microprocessor is supported by a Motorola 56001 DSP clocked at 32 MHz and performing ca. 16 million instructions per second. Although it is oriented to sound processing (it is directly connected to the RAM and codec via an interconnection matrix), it is also capable of graphics processing (for example, calculation of fractals, deformations, 3D projections, and JPEG decompression). It can even, jointly with the 68030, play MP3 files in real time.

Another innovation (for its time) is the VIDEL video controller. The possibilities offered by the graphics processor are limited only by its frequency (25/32 MHz core, adjustable to 50 MHz with a hardware accelerator) and the slowness of the RAM, as the graphics memory is shared with system memory which can degrade performance significantly when using high resolutions or video modes requiring many bit planes. The parameters are numerous; each timing of a video line (start, end, number of pixels, etc.) is adjustable, the image may be interlaced or not, and the vertical frequency can go down to 50 Hz interlaced to display on a television. The number of colors is also adjustable when VIDEL operates in bit plane mode. This mode is available for compatibility with the previous generation, but is quite complex to manage. There is also a true color 16-bit mode in which bits defining each pixel are grouped together to display 65,536 colors simultaneously, though CPU performance is degraded while displaying this mode.

In addition, Atari adopted the IDE bus in addition to the SCSI bus for connecting hard drives and CD-ROM drives. This allows for less expensive disk and CD-ROM devices, as SCSI interfaced devices remained relatively expensive. However, the IDE connector is internal and requires case modification to connect two hard disks or a single CD-ROM. The other drawback is that this early IDE port uses only programmed I/O unlike a SCSI drive that can directly access the RAM (DMA).

Specifications 
Source.

 FPU: optional Motorola 68881 or 68882, PLCC socket
 Graphics: "VIDEL" fully programmable video controller
 Palette of 262,144 possible colours (18 bit), 256 new color registers
 Bitplane modes of 2, 4, 16 or 256 colors (1, 2, 4 or 8 bit)
 Chunky 16-bit truecolor mode
 RGB output can feed either  RGB monitor or TV, old Atari SM124 monitor or a VGA monitor
 Despite the capabilities of the Videl, the plain TOS allows the user the choice of only a few resolutions up to 640×480 (or even less in the case of 16-bit mode and VGA). In order to achieve the full potential of the Videl, one has to use one of the numerous existing alternative utilities, such as "Videlity", "Videl Inside", "Blow UP", etc.
 Backwards compatible with all ST resolutions
 Character set: Atari ST character set, based on codepage 437
 Audio:
 16-bit audio input and output up to  - 8 stereo channels
 SDMA sound/DMA co-processor
 Yamaha Y3439-F 3 Channel PSG (for backward compatibility with ST)
 Memory: 1, 4, or 14 MB of RAM with 512 KB ROM
 Bus speed: , Bus width: 16 bit
 Drives and I/O:
  IDE hard disk - internal
 1.44 MB  PC-compatible floppy disk - internal
 External SCSI-II connector
 MIDI IN and OUT
 2x serial ports
 Bidirectional LPT port
 DSP port with I²S buses for external expansions as ADCs/DACs, S/PDIF or ADAT interfaces
 2× 9-pin mouse/joystick ports
 2× analog joystick (compatible with STE and Jaguar)
 ROM/Cartridge port used mainly by dongles and some expansion cards
 LocalTalk-compatible LAN port

Legacy
Atari created a number of prototypes of the Falcon040 (based on the more capable fully pipelined, integrated-FPU, Motorola 68040, and using a "microbox" case), but canceled it. The microbox case resembled the later Sony PlayStation 2, right down to the ability to run it vertically or horizontally. It is even referenced in the PS2 patent applications.

In 1995, the music company C-Lab bought the rights to the Falcon hardware design and began producing their own versions. The Falcon Mk I was a direct continuation of Atari's Falcon030 with TOS 4.04. The Falcon Mk II addressed a number of shortcomings in the original design, making it more suitable to use in a recording studio (these were unofficially termed 'Cubase modifications') such as accepting Line-level audio in without the need for a pre-amp or mixer. The Falcon Mk X was mounted in a 19" 1U rack case, with external keyboard and space for internal SCSI hard disk drives.

Due to its expansion capabilities, several accelerators have been produced. Some of them overclock the CPU and/or the bus, while others upgrade the CPU to a Motorola 68060.

See also
Bitstream Speedo Fonts
Hatari is able to emulate a Falcon on a variety of different systems

References

External links
Atari Museum 
Atari Falcon 030 at Old-Computers.com
Power Phenix (for Czuba Tech upgrades CT60/CT63 [68060@100] and CTPCI [4-slot PCI-board via CT60/CT63])
WEB page of a Falcon CT60 user Photos, installation, software patches
Falcon review, 1994

Atari ST
Products introduced in 1992